Esporte Clube Pinheiros, commonly known as Pinheiros, was a Brazilian football club from Curitiba. The club won three times the state championship, the Campeonato Paranaense, and competed twice in the national championship.

History

Savóia Futebol Clube were founded in 1914, while Esporte Club Água Verde were founded in 1915. Savóia and Água Verde merged in 1920 to form Savóia-Água Verde. Savóia-Água Verde were renamed to Savóia Futebol Clube in 1921, and then renamed to Esporte Clube Brasil in 1942, and after the World War II, the club were renamed to Esporte Clube Água Verde.

To distinguish itself from its local rivals, the Coritiba, the  club changed its colors in 1960 to blue and white.  In 1971 followed the renaming of the club to Esporte Clube Pinheiros, after the Pinheiro-do-Paraná,  an araucaria, the symbol tree of the state of Paraná.

Pinheiros won the state championship, the Campeonato Paranaense in 1967 as Água Verde, and in 1984 and in 1987 as Pinheiros. The club participated in the national Brazilian Championship, the Série A in 1981 and in 1985, finishing statistically as 34th, respectively as 21st of 44 teams. In its last year of existence Pinheiros also qualified for the main competition of the Brazilian cup, the Copa do Brasil, where the team lost in July 1989 in the first round – 32 clubs – with 0–1 and 1–2 to Mixto EC from Cuiabá in Mato Grosso.

On December 19, 1989, Pinheiros joined forces with local rivals Colorado Esporte Clube to form Paraná Clube.

Titles
Campeonato Paranaense (3): 1967, 1984, 1987
José Milani Cup (1): 1973
Cidade de Curitiba – Troféu Clemente Comandulli (1): 1977

References

Defunct football clubs in Paraná (state)
Association football clubs established in 1914
Association football clubs disestablished in 1989
Paraná Clube
Sport in Curitiba
1914 establishments in Brazil
1989 disestablishments in Brazil